Unbyn is a locality situated in Boden Municipality, Norrbotten County, Sweden with 468 inhabitants in 2010.

References 

Populated places in Boden Municipality
Norrbotten